Jabez G. Fitch (March 20, 1764 - July 31, 1824) was a businessman and political figure from Vermont.  Among the offices in which he served was United States Marshal for Vermont, a position he held from 1794 to 1801.

Life

Early life
Jabez Gale Fitch was born in Norwich, Connecticut, on March 20, 1764, a son of Dr. Jabez Fitch (1729-1806) and Lydia (Huntington) Fitch (1735-1803).  Fitch was raised and educated in Norwich, and his numerous brothers and sisters included Ebenezer Fitch, the first president of Williams College.  During the American Revolution, Fitch went into the naval service while still a boy and he served on the Patriot side until the end of the war.  He served in the militia in Vermont, and attained the rank of colonel, the title by which he was commonly addressed.

Career
When his parents and several siblings moved to Vermont in the late 1780s, Fitch joined them in relocating to the area around Vergennes.  He was active in the local Masonic lodge, served in local offices including town lister, and was involved in civic projects including construction of a courthouse in Vergennes.

Fitch became a merchant and trader.  His enterprises included speculating in land, mills, an iron works, and producing lumber and potash for transport to markets in Quebec via Lake Champlain.  In 1801, he purchased title to the town of Coventry from Ira Allen, then sold lots at moderate prices to encourage settlement in the area.

An early adherent of the Federalist Party, Fitch served in appointed offices including deputy U.S. Marshal.  In 1794, Vermont's first U.S. Marshal, Lewis R. Morris, resigned.  Fitch was appointed to succeed Morris, and served until 1801.  His tenure was most notable for his imprisonment of Democratic-Republican Party politician Matthew Lyon during Lyon's arrest and trial for violating the Alien and Sedition Acts.  Lyon's constituents reelected him to Congress while he was in jail; after the law against sedition expired in 1801, Thomas Jefferson, the first Democratic-Republican president, replaced Fitch as U.S. Marshal with John Willard, a supporter of the Democratic-Republican Party.

In the early 1820s, Fitch became overextended and his holdings were seized to satisfy creditors.  He subsequently moved to Western New York to live with relatives.

Death
Fitch died in Warsaw, New York, on July 31, 1824.  He was buried at Warsaw Cemetery (also known as Warsaw Pioneer Cemetery).

Family
Fitch was married to Speedy Goodrich (d. 1806).  They were the parents of two sons and three daughters.

References

Sources

Books

Internet

Magazines

Newspapers

External links

1764 births
1824 deaths
People of Connecticut in the American Revolution
People from Vergennes, Vermont
Vermont Democratic-Republicans
United States Marshals
People from Warsaw, New York
Burials in New York (state)